Luis Ricardo Escobar Torres (born October 19, 1984, in Celaya, Guanajuato) is a Mexican swimmer, who specialized in open water marathon. In 2010, Escobar became the first ever swimmer to claim an open water swimming title at the Mexican National Championships in Puerto Vallarta, clocking at 2 hours, 11 minutes, and 23.25 seconds. He is also the older brother of Susana Escobar, a long-distance freestyle swimmer, a two-time Olympian, and a member of the swimming team for the Texas Longhorns.

Escobar qualified for the 2008 Summer Olympics in Beijing, after placing fourteenth and receiving a continental spot from the FINA World Open Water Swimming Championships in Seville, Spain. He swam in the first ever men's 10 km open water marathon, against a field of 24 other competitors, including former pool swimmers Petar Stoychev of Bulgaria and Thomas Lurz of Germany. Escobar finished the race in eighteenth place, with a time of 1:53:47.9, one minute and fifty-six seconds (1:56) behind winner Maarten van der Weijden of the Netherlands.

References

External links
NBC Olympics Profile

1984 births
Living people
Mexican male swimmers
Olympic swimmers of Mexico
Swimmers at the 2008 Summer Olympics
Male long-distance swimmers
Sportspeople from Guanajuato
People from Celaya
Swimmers at the 2011 Pan American Games
Pan American Games competitors for Mexico
20th-century Mexican people
21st-century Mexican people